Joseph Déjacque (27 December 1821, in Paris – 1864, in Paris) was a French early anarcho-communist poet, philosopher and writer. He coined the term "libertarian" (French: libertaire) for himself in a political sense in a letter written in 1857, criticizing Pierre-Joseph Proudhon for his sexist views on women, his support of individual ownership of the product of labor and of a market economy. He also published an essay in 1858, titled "On 'Exchange'", in which he wrote that, "it is not the product of his or her labor that the worker has a right to, but to the satisfaction of their needs, whatever may be their nature."

Life

Formative years, from childhood to exile
Born in 1821, Joseph Déjacque grew up fatherless and was raised by his mother, a linen-maker. In 1834 he became an apprentice and, in 1839, a sales clerk in the wallpaper trade. In 1841, he joined the French Navy, where he met with military authoritarianism. Returning to civilian life in 1843, he again worked as a store clerk, but his independence of mind hardly suited employer authority. In 1847, he began to take an interest in socialist ideas, composed poems in which he called for the destruction of all authority by violence, and collaborated in the socialist newspaper L'Atelier, written by workers for workers. He was a member of the Women's Club, founded in April 1848 by Eugénie Niboyet.

Déjacque was first heard of when arrested as part of the revolutionary upheavals in France in 1848. Imprisoned for a time for socialist agitation, he was released but rearrested in 1851, and was sentenced to two years of prison for his collection of poems Les Lazaréennes, Fables et Poésies Sociales, with an additional penalty of 2000 francs. He escaped to London around the time of the December 2, 1851 coup d'état. In London he became associated with Gustave Lefrançais with whom he founded a workers' mutual aid society  La Sociale , before joining the small community of outlaws gathered in Jersey. While in Jersey between 1852 and 1853 he published "La question révolutionnaire", an exposition of anarchism.

A Libertarian in New York 
Déjacque moved to New York in 1854 where, marked by the defeat of 1848, he violently denounced societal injustices - in particular the exploitation and the miserable living conditions of the proletariat, calling for a social revolution. His reflections on individual existence in the industrial and capitalist world led him to develop an original theory of universality and to advocate an uncompromising anarchist policy. In 1855, he signed the inaugural manifesto of an International association, which brought together French socialists, German communists, English chartists and was considered a predecessor of the International Workingmen's Association. Whilst staying in New Orleans from 1856 to 1858, he wrote his famous anarchist utopia L'Humanisphère, Utopie anarchique, but could not find a publisher. Returning to New York he was able to serialise his book in his periodical Le Libertaire, Journal du Mouvement social. Published in 27 issues from 9 June 1858 to 4 February 1861, Le Libertaire was the first anarcho-communist journal published in America. This was the first anarchist journal to use the term "libertarian". An uncompromising anarchist, Joseph Déjacque rejected any system of political representation or delegation that would lead the individual to abdicate his will by letting another express himself in his place. A partisan of the most complete freedom which he called "individual sovereignty", Déjacque is also known to have called for gender equality, in response to the misogyny of Pierre-Joseph Proudhon.

Return to France
Among many articles on revolution and current political events both in France and the USA, Déjacque attacked the hanging of John Brown after the raid on Harpers Ferry and propagandised for the abolitionist cause. As the American Civil War began, Déjacque published a last issue of "Libertaire" in January 1861 with an urgent appeal: "The American Question: the irrepressible conflict" in which he exhorts the American people, whom he would like to be "less religious and more socialist", to defend freedom and the Republic against the "Jesuits, slavers, absolutists and authoritarians" who were at their door. His stay in New York ended when his work prospects ran out due to the economic slump caused by the civil war. Joseph Déjacque returned to London and then to Paris following the amnesty, where he died a few years later in extreme poverty.

See also 
 Anarchism in France
 Libertarian socialism

References

External links 

 Joseph Déjacque : Anarchist and Inventor of the Term "Libertarianism", archive at RevoltLib
 Works in French
 Joseph Déjacque page from the Anarchist Encyclopedia
 Joseph Déjacque page at Libertarian Labyrinth
 An english language translation of Joseph Dejacque's utopian vision "L'Humanisphere" at the Digital Reource Commons of the University of Cincinnati

1821 births
1864 deaths
Anarcho-communists
French anarchists
French anti-capitalists
French male writers
French political writers
French prisoners and detainees
History of libertarianism
Libertarian socialists
Writers from Paris
French abolitionists